Kim Ran Sook(Korean:김란숙) is a South Korean paralympic archer. She won the silver medal at the Women's team recurve event at the 2008 Summer Paralympics in Beijing.

References

South Korean female archers
Living people
Paralympic silver medalists for South Korea
Paralympic archers of South Korea
Archers at the 2008 Summer Paralympics
Medalists at the 2008 Summer Paralympics
Medalists at the 2012 Summer Paralympics
Archers at the 2012 Summer Paralympics
Paralympic gold medalists for South Korea
Year of birth missing (living people)
Paralympic medalists in archery
21st-century South Korean women